The 2008 Greek Ice Hockey Championship season was the seventh season of the Greek Ice Hockey Championship, the first since 2000. Iptamenoi Pagodromoi Athinai won their fourth league title.

Regular season

Playoffs 
Semifinals:
 Iptameni Pagodromoi Athen - Lefka Gerakia 16:1, 15:0
 Albatros Athen - PAOK Saloniki 12:4, 4:8, 1:0 
Final 
 Iptameni Pagodromoi Athen - Albatros Athen 6:3, 9:5

External links
Season on icehockey.gr

Greek
Ice Hockey Championship season